A submerged continent or a sunken continent is a region of continental crust, extensive in size but mainly undersea. The terminology is used by some paleogeologists and geographers in reference to some landmasses (none of which are as large as any of the seven generally-recognized continents).

The definition of this term is unclear.

Other notable submerged lands include Beringia, Doggerland, the Kerguelen Plateau, Mauritia, Sahul, and Sunda.

Submerged continents have been sought and speculated about in regard to a possible "lost continent" underwater in the Atlantic Ocean. There was also a search in the 1930s for Lemuria, thought to have been a submerged continent between the Indian and African coasts.

See also

References

Continental fragments
Continents